Euzophera rinmea is a species of snout moth in the genus Euzophera. It was described by Harrison Gray Dyar Jr. in 1914, and is known from Trinidad and Panama.

References

Moths described in 1914
Phycitini
Moths of North America